The 1987 2. divisjon was a Norwegian second-tier football league season.

The league was contested by 24 teams, divided into two groups; A and B. The winners of group A and B were promoted to the 1988 1. divisjon. The second placed teams met the 10th position finisher in the 1. divisjon in a qualification round where the winner was promoted to 1. divisjon. The bottom three teams inn both groups were relegated to the 3. divisjon.

Overview

Summary
Sogndal won group A with 49 points and Strømmen won group B with 46 points. Both teams promoted to the 1988 1. divisjon. The second-placed teams, Djerv 1919 and Lyn met HamKam in the promotion play-offs. Djerv 1919 won the qualification and was promoted to the 1. divisjon.

New rules
For the first time in Norwegian football, three rather than two points were given for wins. There was also another, more controversial new rule for points: if a match was drawn, two points would be given to the winner of a penalty shootout, and one point to the loser of the shootout. This rule, suggested by Tom A. Schanke and appointed by the Norwegian Football Association in February 1987, was highly controversial and liquidated after the 1987 season.

Tables

Group A

Group B

Promotion play-offs

Results
 12 October 1987: Lyn – Djerv 1919 0–1
 16 October 1987: HamKam – Lyn 1–1
 19 October 1987: Djerv 1919 – HamKam 3–0

Djerv 1919 won the qualification round and won promotion to the 1. divisjon.

Play-off table

References

Norwegian First Division seasons
1987 in Norwegian football
Norway
Norway